The Marriage of Heaven and Hell Part II is the seventh studio album by American power metal band Virgin Steele and the second of three albums in "The Marriage of Heaven and Hell" series. It was mostly written and composed by David DeFeis and Edward Pursino. It is a well received album for its romantic and lyrical approach and its being a major influence on symphonic metal.

Track listing 
All lyrics by David DeFeis, music as listed

Personnel

Band members 
 David DeFeis - all vocals, keyboards, producer
 Edward Pursino - all guitars
 Rob DeMartino - bass
 Joey Ayvazian - drums on tracks 1, 2, 3, 4, 11, 12
 Frank Gilchriest - drums on tracks 5, 6, 7, 8, 9, 10

Additional musicians 
 Frank Zummo - drums on track 13

Production 
 Steve Young - producer, engineer, mixing
 Axel Thubeauville - executive producer

References 

1996 albums
Virgin Steele albums
Noise Records albums